Ellen Wright Clayton is an American Rosalind E. Franklin Professor of genetics and chairwoman of the Institute of Medicine Board at the Population Health and Public Health Practice who became a 2013 recipient of the David Rall Medal.

Early life
Wright Clayton was born in Houston, Texas, where she attended school. She  graduated from Duke with a degree in zoology and then obtained master's degree in biochemistry from Stanford University. Some years later she got her degree in law from Yale, and medical degree from Harvard respectively.

Career
From 1988 she served as Vanderbilt University faculty member and since that time has published two books and over 150 peer-reviewed articles relating to law, medicine and public health. She serves on the advisory board panel of both the National Institutes of Health and Human Genome Organisation. In 2006, she was elected to IOM and three years later became its council member. In 2012, she began her three-year term as its BPH chairwoman. Since November 6, 2013, she has served as Nashville Business Journal editor. Currently she teaches in both medical and law schools and is a director of Vanderbilt's Center for Genetics and Health Policy.

Awards and honours
Clayton is a fellow of both AAAS and American Pediatric Society.

Personal life
On Sundays she sang in a choir.

Selected publications

References

External links
Ellen Wright Clayton

Living people
American geneticists
Duke University alumni
Harvard Medical School alumni
Yale Law School alumni
People from Houston
Year of birth missing (living people)
Vanderbilt University Law School faculty
Members of the National Academy of Medicine